To constitute India's 17th Lok Sabha, general elections were held in April–May 2019. The results were announced on 23 May 2019. The main contenders were two alliance groups of the Incumbent National Democratic Alliance and the Opposition United Progressive Alliance and Indian National Congress respectively. The 2019 Indian general election has been the Largest Democratic exercise in History so far, with around 912 million eligible voters.

This article describes the performance of various political parties. For the performance of individual candidates, please see, List of members of the 17th Lok Sabha.

Results by alliance and party

The Bharatiya Janata Party-led NDA won the elections with the BJP itself winning a clear majority. The BJP became the single largest party in the House and surpassed expectations to win 303 seats, with its alliance partners bringing the NDA to a total of 353 seats. Reasons attributed to the victory included the personal popularity of Narendra Modi, effective voter turnout drives by the NDA, a surge in public nationalism following the Pulwama attack, the consolidation of Hindu voters in a multi-caste coalition and the successful implementation of social welfare programmes during the First Modi ministry's term.

The counting of votes was held on 23 May 2019, and was completed early the following day. Initial returns showed the BJP leading in all 303 constituencies it eventually won, and opposition leader Rahul Gandhi conceded defeat prior to the official certification of most results.

With the results, the BJP was able to gain 21 seats in the House, having won 282 in the 2014 Indian general election. It was the second time in India's independent history that voters re-elected the same party to power with a bigger majority to the Lok Sabha – India's lower house of parliament. The BJP's total vote share stood at 37.4 per cent, an increase of over 6 percentage points from 31.34 per cent in 2014. The National Democratic Alliance secured a vote share of 45 per cent, compared to 38 per cent in 2014. In contrast, the vote share of Indian National Congress remained the same at 19.5 per cent. About 1.04 percent of the voters in India chose to vote for None Of The Above (NOTA) in the 2019 elections, with Bihar leading with 2.08 percent NOTA voters.

Modi was re-elected as the Prime Minister with the biggest gain in vote-share in history(+6.02%). His opponent, Rahul Gandhi, ran in two constituencies, winning from Wayanad, but losing from the Amethi constituency – the seat he, his mother (Sonia Gandhi), his father (Rajiv Gandhi), and his uncle (Sanjay Gandhi) had collectively held for decades. In addition, many candidates who were members of popular political dynasties were defeated across India in favour of the BJP or other parties' candidates.

The election had been called a referendum on Modi and the BJP's Hindu nationalistic policies and advocacy. According to The Wall Street Journal, Modi's victory "sets (sic) the stage for further economic change in one of Asia’s fastest-growing economies." Alasdair Pal and Mayank Bhardwaj, in an article published by Reuters, claimed that the result was a mandate for business-friendly policies and tougher national security positions, reinforcing "a global trend of right-wing populists sweeping to victory, from the United States to Brazil and Italy, often after adopting harsh positions on protectionism, immigration and defence."

According to a data analysis by the Mint, "The ruling party’s victory has been broad-based, gaining seats in most parts of the country, and across the rural-urban divide, cementing its pole position in Indian politics." However according to this study conducted in about 140 constituencies, BJP seems more popular and successful in urban and metropolitan constituencies than rural and semi-urban constituencies. The BJP was favored in all income groups, states the Mint. The newspaper added, "In constituencies with high presence of scheduled castes and scheduled tribes (SCs/STs), the BJP is more popular than other parties, but in constituencies with high presence of Muslims, it is less popular."

According to India Today, detailed accounts and reports suggest that the country's overall growth were not among top factors that helped Narendra Modi's party cruise to a landslide victory in the elections and that the government has been able to successfully implement schemes that directly affect the rural population.

Results by State

Andaman and Nicobar Islands (1)

Andhra Pradesh (25)

Arunachal Pradesh (2)

Assam (14)

Bihar (40)

Chandigarh (1)

Chhattisgarh (11)

Dadra and Nagar Haveli (1)

Daman and Diu (1)

NCT of Delhi (7)

Goa (2)

Gujarat (26)

Haryana (10)

Himachal Pradesh (4)

Jammu and Kashmir (6)

Jharkhand (14)

Karnataka (28)

Kerala (20)

Lakshadweep (1)

Madhya Pradesh (29)

Maharashtra (48)

Manipur (2)

Meghalaya (2)

Mizoram (1)

Nagaland (1)

Odisha (21)

Puducherry (1)

Punjab (13)

Rajasthan (25)

Sikkim (1)

Tamil Nadu (39)

Telangana (17)

Tripura (2)

Uttar Pradesh (80)

Uttarakhand (5)

West Bengal (42)

Seats won by and valid votes polled for each party, by state
Based on the published data from the Election Commission of India (ECI) website.

Results by constituency

Notes

References 

2019 Indian general election
Results of general elections in India